The kea is a parrot native to New Zealand.

Kea can also refer to:

Kea, Cornwall, civil parish and village in Cornwall, in the United Kingdom
Saint Kea, a 5th-century Christian saint
Kea (island), an island in Cyclades, Greece
Kea, the New Zealand name for Beavers, that part of the Boy Scout Movement for boys under the age of eight
Kea Province, Greece
Kea (ferry), an Auckland harbour ferry, named for the bird
Kea (software), DHCP server software under development by Internet Systems Consortium
Clarence Kea, a retired American professional basketball player
Salaria Kea, African-American nurse and desegregation activist
 
KEA can also refer to:
Keyphrase Extraction Algorithm, an algorithm for extracting keyphrases from text documents
KEA (aircraft manufacturer), a Greek aircraft manufacturer
Kill 'Em All, the debut album of the thrash metal band Metallica
Koning Eizenberg Architecture
Korea Express Air
Eurodemocratic Renewal Party (Komma Evrodimokratikis Ananeosis), a political party in Cyprus created by Alexis Galanos
Canadian Esperanto Association (Kanada Esperanto-Asocio)
KEA (Kiwi Expats Abroad) NPO, associated with NZTE

See also 
 KEAS (disambiguation)
 KIA (disambiguation)
 Kya (disambiguation)